is a former Japanese football player.

Playing career
Shimabukuro was born in Nagasaki Prefecture on January 13, 1983. After graduating from high school, he joined J2 League club Sagan Tosu in 2001. On April 18, he debuted as substitute midfielder in J.League Cup (v Vissel Kobe). However he could only play this match until 2002. In 2003, he moved to Japan Football League club ALO's Hokuriku. He played many matches from 2003 season. However his opportunity to play decreased year by year and he retired end of 2006 season.

Club statistics

References

External links

1983 births
Living people
Association football people from Nagasaki Prefecture
Japanese footballers
J2 League players
Japan Football League players
Sagan Tosu players
Kataller Toyama players
Association football midfielders